The Ministry of Youth Affairs and Skills Development is the Sri Lankan government ministry responsible “to build up a young generation capable of actively participating in national development endowed with skills and personality.”

List of ministers

The Minister of Youth Affairs and Skills Development is an appointment in the Cabinet of Sri Lanka.

Parties

See also
 List of ministries of Sri Lanka

References

External links
 Ministry of Youth Affairs and Skills Development
 Government of Sri Lanka

Youth Affairs and Skills Development
Youth Affairs and Skills Development